Kevin De Serpa (born May 21, 1980 in Toronto, Ontario) is a Canadian soccer player, coach, futsal player, and freestyle footballer,

Career 
De Serpa played professionally for a number of years abroad before returning to Canada to start Ginga Soccer Inc.

References

External links
Canadian Soccer Association profile

1980 births
Living people
Canadian expatriate soccer players
Canadian Soccer League (1998–present) players
Canadian soccer players
Association football midfielders
Association football forwards
Hamilton Thunder players
FK Haugesund players
SK Vard Haugesund players
Mandalskameratene players
Soccer players from Toronto
Toronto Lynx players
Toronto (Mississauga) Olympians players
Real Avilés CF footballers
FC London players
USL League Two players